John Renwick McAslan  (born 16 February 1954) is a British architect.

Education and career

John McAslan was educated at Dunoon Grammar School, Dollar Academy and University of Edinburgh, Scotland, obtaining an MA in Architecture in 1977 and a Diploma in 1978. He trained in Boston, USA, with Cambridge Seven Associates before joining Richard Rogers and Partners in 1980. He founded John McAslan + Partners in 1996, where he remains as Executive Chairman and is active in all of the practice's work.

While much of McAslan's work focuses on new buildings, he is also well known for his careful restoration and redevelopment of historic buildings in the UK and overseas, including iconic London landmarks such as the Roundhouse. Such work typically brings both new form and function to old structures; the 2012 western concourse at London's King's Cross station, for example, combines striking design with efficient and practical central purpose, allowing large numbers of people to move freely between platforms at the busiest times of day.

McAslan has taught and lectured widely and is a trustee of a number of cultural bodies.

Philanthropy

In 1997 McAslan established the John McAslan Family Trust, a registered charity which provides support for arts and educational projects both in the UK and overseas. In 2008 the Trust acquired the Burgh Hall at Dunoon from a property developer for the token sum of £1, with the aim of restoring the building and creating a new community-focused centre for contemporary arts. The final phase of this project was completed in 2017.

In 2004, John McAslan + Partners, the Royal Institute of British Architects (RIBA) and the Institution of Civil Engineers (ICE) jointly established a new bursary to recognise and support innovative design projects. In recent years, the bursary has strengthened its focus on the role of design as an instrument for positive change, particularly in projects addressing environmental and community issues. In 2015, the Environment Agency contributed £10,000 to the bursary scheme to support projects demonstrating progress towards sustainable climate change solutions.

In 2019 John McAslan + Partners and the American Institute of Architects jointly launched the McAslan Architecture Travel Fellowship which awarded two US Architecture students annually with a study and travel scholarship to work with the World Monuments Fund in the restoration program for the Madame Gauthier Villa in Port-au-Prince, Haiti.

Honours and awards
John McAslan + Partners was named World Architect of the Year in 2009 by Building Design magazine. The practice's work has been extensively exhibited and has received more than 170 international design awards, including 29 RIBA international, national, regional and special awards.

McAslan was appointed Commander of the Order of the British Empire in the New Year Honours 2012, for his services to architecture. He was also appointed Honorary Consul of The Republic of Haiti (to the Court of St James's) in the United Kingdom between 2012–13, following the practice's work and assistance in the wake of the 2010 Haiti earthquake. In 2014 he was appointed Regent to the University of Edinburgh, and was awarded an honorary degree of Doctor honoris causa in 2015. In 2019 McAslan was elected a Fellow of the Royal Society of Edinburgh.

Projects

References

External links
John McAslan + Partners website
Arch Daily
Archello
Dezeen
E-Architect

1954 births
Living people
People educated at Dollar Academy
Architects from Glasgow
Commanders of the Order of the British Empire
Alumni of the University of Edinburgh